Clubul Atletic Timișoara was a football club based in Timișoara, western Romania. It was founded in 1902 and dissolved in 1936.

History

In the Józsefváros neighborhood of Temesvár, Kingdom of Hungary, Austria-Hungary, on April 26 1902, as a result of initiative of a group of young people led by dr. Péter Dobroszláv, in one of the halls of the City Report House, Elite Palace (the building of the current restaurant Sinaia), Temesvár Football Club (TFC) was established. The chosen colors were white and green. The club had 30 members, and was run by president dr. Adalbert Meskó, vice-president Rudolf Trinksz and Viktor Kovács.

In 1913, the club won the Temesvár District Championship with the following team: Drexler – Löbl, Soma, Scholmanski, Aichiger, Rausberger – Franz, Bauer, Weinberger, Molnár II, Molnár I.

After World War I the city became part of Romania, and so the club name was changed to Clubul Atletic Timișoara (CAT). It became the first club dedicated exclusively to football in present-day Romania. The team regularly participates at the Timișoara District Championship, starting with the autumn of 1921. Players used during the 1921–27 period numbered a lot of known internationals, such as: Zimmermann, Kozovits, Holz, Raffinski.

At the end of the 1925–26 season, it finished first and qualified at the final tournament of the national championship. But, after a litigation it is replaced by Chinezul Timișoara and loses the chance to appear in the competition.

In 1934, CA wins the West League, using the following players: Konrad – Havas, Zarkoczy – Iania, Kohn, Faragó – Cărăbuș, Korony, Possak, Molnár, Somogy and plays a double play-off match to promote to the Divizia A against România Cluj.  Although it won the first match, CA lost the rematch – set after a litigation – and instead of playing in the Divizia A, it played in the first season of the Divizia B. The that season of the Divizia B, finishes 3rd in the Seria II. The next season RGM finishes 4th. Team used: Gervin – Gerber, Hajdu – Pokomy, Weidle, Morawetz – Seceni, Tóth, Stepan, Jánosi, Reuter.

In the summer of 1936, CA Timișoara disappeared after a merger with RGM Timișoara, the new team being named CAM Timișoara.

Players 

Players used during the 1921–27 period numbered a lot of known internationals, such as: 
Zimmermann, 
Kozovits, 
Holz, 
Raffinski.

Football clubs in Timiș County
Association football clubs established in 1902
Association football clubs disestablished in 1936
Defunct football clubs in Romania
Liga II clubs
Sport in Timișoara
1902 establishments in Austria-Hungary
1936 disestablishments in Romania